The Doubles luge competition at the 1964 Winter Olympics in Innsbruck was held on 5 February, at Olympic Sliding Centre Innsbruck.

Results

References

Luge at the 1964 Winter Olympics
Men's events at the 1964 Winter Olympics